Mary-Kate and Ashley in Action! is an American animated children's television series featuring the voices and likeness of Mary-Kate and Ashley Olsen. It is also a series of books that spun off, from the show. The show premiered on October 20, 2001, on the ABC block Disney's One Saturday Morning, and was cancelled after one season due to low ratings. It was the last TV series to star both Mary-Kate and Ashley.

Cast
 Mary-Kate Olsen as Herself / Special Agent Misty
 Ashley Olsen as Herself / Special Agent Amber
 Terry Chen as Rodney Choy
 Michael Heyward as Ivan Quintero
 Brendan Beiser as Quincy
 Michael Dobson as Clive Hedgemorton-Smythe
 Lenore Zann as Renee La Rouge
 Maggie Blue O'Hara as Romy Bates
 Sam Vincent as Capital D
 Kim Hawthorne as Bernice Shaw and Dr. Sandy
 Jason Connery as Bennington
 Christopher Gray as Oliver Dickens

Additional voices

 Alistair Abell
 Leanne Adachi
 Carmen Aguirre
 Sean Amsing
 Brian Arnold
 Michael Benyaer
 Suzanne Coy
 Kaj Ericsen
 Gweem Eyre
 Colin Foo
 Jean Forgie
 Glen Gould
 Mackenzie Gray
 Mark Hildreth
 Britt Irvin
 Dan Joffre
 Ellen Kennedy
 Gabe Khouth
 Kaleena Kiff
 Viv Leacock
 Santo Lombardo
 Kirstie Marsden
 Jason Michas
 Maxine Miller
 Sara Mitchell
 Vanessa Morley
 Kirby Morrow
 Jesse Moss
 Colin Murdock
 Richard Newman
 Nicole Oliver
 Alonso Oyarzun
bJohn Payne
 Robert O. Smith
 Tracey-Lee Smyth
 Farrell Spence
 Moneca Stori
 Lee Tockar
 Yee Jee Tso
 Valerie Sing Turner
 Kimberly Warnat
 Dale Wilson
 Nelson Wong
 Donna Yamamoto
 Chiara Zanni

Episodes

Production
A co-production of DIC and Canal J, the show was in production under the tentative title Action Girls. 52 episodes were tentatively planned for the series.

After its premiere on ABC in the United States, in November 2001, DIC pre-sold the series internationally to CITV (and later Nickelodeon as well) in the UK, Canal J in France, Mediaset in Italy, YTV in Canada and Fox Kids Latin America.

In April 2002, Televisa in Mexico and RTÉ in Ireland purchased broadcast rights to the series in their respective countries.

Broadcast
From September 2002 – 2003, following the channel's rebrand, Toon Disney reaired the series alongside other ex-One Saturday Morning shows.

In April 2015, Nickelodeon acquired several US broadcast rights to DualStar's content library, including this series, although it was never re-ran on the channel.

DVD releases 
In June 2005, Warner Home Video released a single-disc volume called "Misty and Amber vs. Renee la Rouge", featuring 5 episodes of the series focusing on the villain Renee la Rouge. The episodes come with English, Spanish and French audio tracks, as well as featuring a Trivia Challenge and a Villain Bio as bonus features.

In 2016, the series was released to iTunes, but it contained the same episodes only available on the Volume 1 DVD.

Books 
The series spun-off a series of books published by Dualstar Books and HarperEntertainment in 2002. In the books, the twins are special agents assigned to solve different mysteries around the fashion and sports world, and have to travel to such cities as New York City, Paris, and Rome to do it.

The series includes:
 Book number 1: Makeup Shakeup. Setting: New York and Paris.
 Book number 2: The Dream Team. Setting: Rome.
 Book number 3: Fubble Bubble Trouble. Setting: The Mall of Malls, a fictional mall that appears to be based on the Mall of America
 Book number 4: Operation Evaporation. Setting:  Bermuda.
 Book number 5: Dog Gone Mess: Setting: Germany.
 Book number 6: The Music Meltdown. Setting: Washington, D.C.
 Book number 7: Password: Red Hot Setting: England.
 Book number 8: Fast Food Fight Setting: Anytown, USA

References

External links 
 
 

2000s American animated television series
2001 American television series debuts
2002 American television series endings
American children's animated action television series
American children's animated adventure television series
American children's animated comedy television series
American television series with live action and animation
Animated television series about sisters
Animated television series about twins
English-language television shows
Disney Channel original programming
ABC Kids (TV programming block)
Teen animated television series
Television series by DIC Entertainment
Mary-Kate and Ashley Olsen
Animation based on real people